Maajussille morsian is a Finnish reality television series based on the British reality show Farmer Wants a Wife. The show was first hosted by Mia Halonen (2006), and then by Miia Nuutila (2007–2016). The current host is Vappu Pimiä (2017–present). The show has had 12 seasons and is still airing new episodes.

Season 1 (2006)

Season 2 (2007)

Season 3 (2008)

Season 4 (2010)

Season 5 (2011)

Season 6 (2013)

Season 7 (2014)

Season 8 (2015)

References

External links
 

2006 Finnish television series debuts
Finnish reality television series
Finnish non-fiction television series